The 2022 İstanbul Cup (also known as the TEB BNP Paribas Tennis Championship İstanbul for sponsorship reasons) was a tennis tournament played on outdoor clay courts. It was the 15th edition of the İstanbul Cup, and part of the WTA International tournaments of the 2022 WTA Tour. It took place in Istanbul, Turkey, from 19 through 24 April 2022.

Champions

Singles 

  Anastasia Potapova def.  Veronika Kudermetova 6–3, 6–1

This is Potapova's first career WTA singles title.

Doubles 

  Marie Bouzková /  Sara Sorribes Tormo def.  Natela Dzalamidze /  Kamilla Rakhimova 6–3, 6–4

Point and Prize Money

Point

Prize money

Singles main draw entrants

Seeds 

† Ranking are as of 11 April 2022.

Other entrants 
The following players received wildcard entry into the singles main draw :
  Nikola Bartůňková
  İpek Öz
  Pemra Özgen

The following players received entry from the qualifying draw :
  Ana Bogdan
  Julia Grabher
  Marina Melnikova
  Anastasia Potapova
  Lesia Tsurenko
  Wang Qiang

The following player received entry as a lucky loser :
  Jaimee Fourlis
  Kamilla Rakhimova

Withdrawals 
 Before the tournament
  Caroline Garcia → replaced by  Anna Karolína Schmiedlová
  Marta Kostyuk → replaced by  Arantxa Rus
  Camila Osorio → replaced by  Marie Bouzková
  Zheng Qinwen → replaced by  Anna Bondár
  Aliaksandra Sasnovich → replaced by  Kamilla Rakhimova
  Kateřina Siniaková → replaced by  Greet Minnen
  Clara Tauson → replaced by  Rebecca Peterson
  Alison Van Uytvanck → replaced by  Jaimee Fourlis

Doubles main draw entrants

Seeds 

1 Rankings as of 11 April 2022.

Other entrants 
The following pairs received wildcard entry into the doubles main draw:
  Ayla Aksu /  Zeynep Sönmez
  Berfu Cengiz /  İpek Öz

The following pairs received entry as an alternates:
  Angelina Gabueva /  Anastasia Zakharova
  Marina Melnikova /  Anastasia Tikhonova

Withdrawals 
 Before the tournament
  Kirsten Flipkens /  Sara Sorribes Tormo → replaced by  Anastasia Potapova /  Rebecca Peterson
  Veronika Kudermetova /  Elise Mertens → replaced by  Angelina Gabueva /  Anastasia Zakharova
  Caty McNally /  Anna Kalinskaya → replaced by  Marina Melnikova /  Anastasia Tikhonova

References 

2022 WTA Tour
2022 Istanbul Cup
2022 in Turkish sport
April 2022 sports events in Turkey